Trenčianske Mitice   is a village and municipality in Trenčín District in the Trenčín Region of north-western Slovakia.

History
The current village was formed in 1960 through the merging  of three villages - Zemianske Mitice, Kostolné Mitice a Rožňové Mitice. In historical records the village was first mentioned in 1269.

Geography
The municipality lies at an altitude of 332 metres and covers an area of 12.836 km2. It has a population of about 716 people.

External links
http://www.statistics.sk/mosmis/eng/run.html

Villages and municipalities in Trenčín District